Jacques "Jacky" Laposte (born 24 March 1952) is a French former professional footballer who played as a midfielder. He spent his entire senior career at Paris Saint-Germain.

Club career 
Laposte began his career in his hometown club of La Gauloise de Trinité in La Trinité, Martinique. In 1972, alongside fellow Trinitaire Christian André, he joined Paris Saint-Germain, who was in the Division 3 at the time. He helped the club gain successive promotions to the Division 1, notably scoring a 25-meter volley in a 6–1 win over Arles on 12 May 1974 in the Division 2.

In 1977, Laposte suffered a serious knee injury, which sidelined him for the entirety of the 1977–78 season. He left PSG in 1979, having scored 17 goals and made a total of 175 appearances, and subsequently retired.

International career 
While at Paris Saint-Germain, Laposte became a U21 international for France. He went on to play for the France Military team as well.

After football 
After retiring in 1979, Laposte went back to live in Martinique, working as a hospital worker.

References

External links 
 
 

Living people
1952 births
French footballers
Martiniquais footballers
Association football midfielders
France youth international footballers
French people of Martiniquais descent
People from La Trinité, Martinique
Black French sportspeople
La Gauloise de Trinité (football) players
Paris Saint-Germain F.C. players
Ligue 2 players
Ligue 1 players
French Division 3 (1971–1993) players